Thiomuscimol is a GABAA receptor agonist which is structurally related to muscimol.

References

Isothiazoles
GABAA receptor agonists
GABAA-rho receptor agonists